Judge Johnson may refer to:

Alan Bond Johnson (born 1939), judge of the United States District Court for the District of Wyoming
Albert Williams Johnson (1872–1957), judge of the United States District Court for the Middle District of Pennsylvania
Benjamin Johnson (judge) (1784–1849), judge of the United States District Court for the District of Arkansas
Charles Fletcher Johnson (1859–1930), judge of the United States Court of Appeals for the First Circuit
Frank Minis Johnson (1918–1999), judge of the United States Courts of Appeals for the Fifth and Eleventh Circuits
George E. Q. Johnson (1874–1949), judge of the United States District Court for the Northern District of Illinois
Inge Prytz Johnson (born 1945), judge of the United States District Court for the Northern District of Alabama
Jed Johnson (Oklahoma politician) (1888–1963), judge of the United States Customs Court
Jeffrey W. Johnson (born 1960), magistrate judge of the United States District Court for the Central District of California
Joseph T. Johnson (1858–1919), judge of the United States District Court for the Western District of South Carolina
Kristi Haskins Johnson (born 1980), judge of the United States District Court for the Southern District of Mississippi
Luther Alexander Johnson (1875–1965), judge of the United States Tax Court
Noble J. Johnson (1887–1968), judge of the United States Court of Customs and Patent Appeals
Norma Holloway Johnson (1932–2011), judge of the United States District Court for the District of Columbia
Samuel D. Johnson Jr. (1920–2002), judge of the United States Court of Appeals for the Fifth Circuit
Sterling Johnson Jr. (1934–2022), judge of the United States District Court for the Eastern District of New York
Tillman Davis Johnson (1858–1953), judge of the United States District Court for the District of Utah
William Paul Johnson (born 1959), judge of the United States District Court for the District of New Mexico

See also
Harvey M. Johnsen (1895–1975), judge of the United States Court of Appeals for the Eighth Circuit
Justice Johnson (disambiguation)